The fifteenth season of the American television medical drama Grey's Anatomy was ordered on April 20, 2018, by American Broadcasting Company (ABC). The season premiered on September 27, 2018, with a special 2-hour premiere. The episode count for the season consists in 25 episodes. The season is produced by ABC Studios, in association with Shondaland Production Company and Entertainment One Television; the showrunners being Krista Vernoff and William Harper.

In this season, Grey's Anatomy becomes the longest-running American primetime medical drama series, after the series finale of ER on April 2, 2009. It also features the shortest ensemble main cast seen since the ninth season. Kim Raver was repromoted as series-regular after 5 guest appearances in the previous season.

Episodes 

The number in the "No. overall" column refers to the episode's number within the overall series, whereas the number in the "No. in season" column refers to the episode's number within this particular season. "U.S. viewers in millions" refers to the number of Americans in millions who watched the episodes live. Each episode of this season is named after a song.

Cast and characters

Main 
 Ellen Pompeo as Dr. Meredith Grey
 Justin Chambers as Dr. Alex Karev
 Chandra Wilson as Dr. Miranda Bailey
 James Pickens Jr. as Dr. Richard Webber
 Kevin McKidd as Dr. Owen Hunt
 Jesse Williams as Dr. Jackson Avery
 Caterina Scorsone as Dr. Amelia Shepherd
 Camilla Luddington as Dr. Jo Karev
 Kelly McCreary as Dr. Maggie Pierce
 Giacomo Gianniotti as Dr. Andrew DeLuca
 Kim Raver as Dr. Teddy Altman

Recurring 
 Jason George as Dr. Ben Warren
 Greg Germann as Dr. Tom Koracick
 Jake Borelli as Dr. Levi Schmitt
 Chris Carmack as Dr. Atticus "Link" Lincoln
 Debbie Allen as Dr. Catherine Fox
 Stefania Spampinato as Dr. Carina DeLuca
 Alex Blue Davis as Dr. Casey Parker
 Rushi Kota as Dr. Vikram Roy
 Jaicy Elliot as Dr. Taryn Helm
 Sophia Ali as Dr. Dahlia Qadri
 Peyton Kennedy as Betty Nelson
 Alex Landi as Dr. Nico Kim
 Caroline Clay as Cece Colvin
 Jaina Lee Ortiz as LT Andrea "Andy" Herrera
 Stacey Oristano as Nurse Frankie Shavelson
 Kate Burton as Dr. Ellis Grey
 Jennifer Grey as Carol Dickinson
 Kyle Secor as John Dickinson
 Lindsay Wagner as Helen Karev
 Lorenzo Caccialanza as Dr. Vincenzo DeLuca

Notable guests 
 Okieriete Onaodowan as Dean Miller
 Jasmine Guy as Gemma Larson
 Debra Mooney as Evelyn Hunt
 Josh Radnor as John
 Jeff Perry as Thatcher Grey
 Michelle Forbes as Vicki Ann Rudin
 Michael Evans Behling as Brady
 Abigail Spencer as Dr. Megan Hunt
 Tyne Daly as Carolyn Shepherd
 Amy Acker as Dr. Kathleen Shepherd
 Embeth Davidtz as Dr. Nancy Shepherd
 Khalilah Joi as Abby Redding 
 Joshua Bassett as Linus 
 Boris Kodjoe as Robert Sullivan
 Brett Tucker as Lucas Ripley

Production

Casting 
On May 21, 2018, it was announced that Kim Raver had once again been promoted to series-regular this season after previously having a recurring role last season. On July 31, 2018, it was announced that Chris Carmack would be starring in a recurring role for Season 15, being revealed that he would play the role of a new orthopedic surgeon at the hospital. On August 13, 2018, it was announced that Jeff Perry would be returning as Thatcher Grey, Meredith's father, for the first time since his last appearance in the seventh season. On September 6, 2018, it was announced that Alex Landi had been cast in a recurring role as Dr. Nico Kim, who will be the first gay male surgeon to appear on the show. On October 10, 2018, it was announced that Josh Radnor had been cast as Meredith's new love-interest. On December 13, 2018, it was announced that Jennifer Grey had been cast in "a mysterious role," later to be revealed she portrayed Betty's mom. 

It was announced on February 13, 2019, that Amy Acker had been cast as Derek Shepherd's fourth sister, Dr. Kathleen Shepherd. Acker is expected to appear in 1 episode this season, that episode being an Amelia-centric episode.  On March 5, 2019, it was revealed that Abigail Spencer would reprise her role as Megan Hunt for 1 episode this season, which will air during spring.

Ratings

Live + SD ratings

Live + 7 Day (DVR) ratings

References 

2018 American television seasons
2019 American television seasons
Grey's Anatomy seasons